Svetlana Vadimovna Ershova (born 14 March 1994) is a Russian weightlifter, competing in the 53 kg and 58 kg categories until 2018 and 55 kg starting in 2018 after the International Weightlifting Federation reorganized the categories.

Career
She competed at the 2019 European Weightlifting Championships in the 55 kg category winning silver medals in the snatch, clean & jerk and total. She won silver the second time at the 2021 European Weightlifting Championships.

Major results

References

1994 births
Living people
Russian female weightlifters
European Weightlifting Championships medalists
21st-century Russian women